Ricardo Salazar (born September 6, 1972) is a referee who currently referees for the Professional Referee Organization and International Matches.  He became a full-time referee in 2007.

MLS

Since becoming a fully professional referee in 2007, Salazar has officiated many matches in Major League Soccer. He has also officiated many important CONCACAF Champions Cup matches, including the CONCACAF Champions Cup Semi Final between Pachuca CF and CD Motagua.

Salazar was also one of the referees picked to officiate in the 2009 Pan-Pacific Championship.

On June 19, 2011, Salazar refereed an MLS match between the New York Red Bulls and Portland Timbers, in which he issued a yellow card to Adam Moffat and a red to Red Bulls star Thierry Henry after an altercation.

Salazar officiated the 2012 Lamar Hunt U.S. Open Cup Final between Sporting Kansas City and Seattle Sounders FC. He handed out six yellow cards, all six to the Sounders, who went on to lose the game.r.

On March 17, 2013, Salazar refereed an MLS match between the LA Galaxy and Chivas USA. Chivas' Velázquez was originally shown his first yellow card of the match after a challenge on Galaxy midfielder Colin Clark. The player was then immediately shown a red card. The Professional Referees Organization (PRO) stated that the original caution card was shown by mistake and it was, in actuality, a red that was issued for the challenge. Chivas made a successful request to have the case reviewed by the independent panel and the card was overturned.

On June 1, 2013, Salazar refereed a match between Chivas USA and the Seattle Sounders FC. Late in the game, Salazar gave a straight red to Seattle's Obafemi Martins of in the 71st minute after a tussle with Chivas player Gabriel Farfan. MLS rescinded the card.

International

Since becoming a FIFA referee in 2005, Salazar had been chosen to officiate six international matches, four of which have been International Friendlies. On May 24, 2010 he officiated a friendly between Australia and New Zealand at the Melbourne Cricket Ground.

International Matches officiated

Card statistics

References

External links
 
 
 

1972 births
American soccer referees
Living people
Sportspeople from Elgin, Illinois
Sportspeople from Bakersfield, California
CONCACAF Champions League referees
Major League Soccer referees